Weller Arnold (23 September 1882 – 28 October 1957) was an Australian cricketer. He played one first-class match for Tasmania in 1914/15.

See also
 List of Tasmanian representative cricketers

References

External links
 

1882 births
1957 deaths
Australian cricketers
Tasmania cricketers
Cricketers from Hobart